Craig W. Johnson (born November 22, 1953) is an American politician who served as a member of the Alaska House of Representatives from 2007 to 2017.

Career 
Johnson was elected to the House in 2006 and assumed office in 2007, representing the 28th district. He later represented the 21st and 24th district. He left office in 2017, and was succeeded by Chuck Kopp.

He was co-chair of the Resources Committee, Chair of the Cook Island Salmon Task Force, Vice-Chair of the Transportation Committee, and was a member of the State Affairs Committee, and the Fisheries Special Committee. He also serves on the Administration, Corrections, Fish & Game and the Natural Resources Finance Subcommittees, for the 26th Legislature. Johnson previously served as a press secretary for the Alaska State House Majority Caucus.

Personal life
Representative Johnson has a wife, Nancy, and two children, Erin & Jenifer. Craig Johnson graduated from Miami High School in Miami, Oklahoma. He attended Northeastern Oklahoma A&M College from 1973–1975, and Oklahoma State University from 1975–1977.

References

External links
 Alaska State House Majority Site
 Alaska State Legislature Biography
 Project Vote Smart profile
 Craig Johnson at 100 Years of Alaska's Legislature

1953 births
21st-century American politicians
Living people
Republican Party members of the Alaska House of Representatives
Northeastern Oklahoma A&M College alumni
Oklahoma State University alumni
Politicians from Anchorage, Alaska
People from Kermit, Texas